The community of Wyman Park is a border community that links Hampden to Roland Park. All of the Wyman Park areas were annexed to Baltimore City in 1888. The general boundaries consist of the area from south to north between 33rd Street and 40th Streets and west to east from Keswick Road to Wyman Park. South of 40th Street, garden apartments, multi-story apartment buildings, and single-family residences have been built. People here tend to relate to the north along 40th Street and University Parkway and Johns Hopkins University. The Wyman Park also accommodates the Union Soldiers and Sailors Monument, located at 29th and Charles Street, and the now removed Stonewall Jackson and Robert E. Lee Monument that has been rededicated as Harriet Tubman Grove on Art Museum Drive.

Throughout the eighteenth and nineteenth centuries, this land remained attached to large rural estates, and the only settlement of note occurred in the adjacent Stony Run valley. Here, along the stream's west bank, two flour mills once operated. It is believed that one mill, Ensor's, was located opposite 36th Street.

In the 1870s, the Swan Lake Narrow Gauge Railroad (later called the Baltimore and Lehigh Railroad, and in 1901, the Maryland and Pennsylvania Railroad) was built along Stony Run. In the last quarter of the nineteenth century, a popular tavern, known as Biddy Rice's Saloon, operated along the tracks opposite Bottle Hill, upon which sits the present-day Tudor Arms Apartments.

Most construction took place in the 1920s and continued into the 1960s with several small garden apartments. In addition, Keswick Nursing Home north of 40th Street has expanded, while next door Roland Park Place has replaced the Roland Park Country School. To the east Johns Hopkins University has slowly expanded into Wyman Park, and some of the open space has disappeared.

Stieff Silver Building
The Stieff Silver building, located on Wyman Park Drive in the Wyman Park neighborhood, is the former headquarters of Stieff Silver Company. Founded in a small shop on Redwood Street in 1914 by silversmith Charles Stieff, the company built its Wyman Park plant in 1925. Its name was changed to Kirk Stieff Company in 1979. The company's operations in Baltimore were discontinued in 1999. After renovations from 2000 to 2001, the building was converted into office space in 2002. It is currently listed on the National Register of Historic Places.

See also
 List of Baltimore neighborhoods

References

External links
History of Wyman Park
Live Baltimore

Neighborhoods in Baltimore
Northern Baltimore